Mark Tout (born 24 June 1961) is an English bobsledder who competed from the mid-1980s to the mid-1990s. Born in Hitchin, Hertfordshire, he attended Cambridgeshire High School for Boys from 1972 to 1977. Competing in four Winter Olympics, he earned his best finish of fifth in the four-man event at Lillehammer in 1994.

His best finish in the Bobsleigh World cup was second in the four-man event in 1994–5.

Tout later received a lifetime ban for testing positive for stanozolol in 1997, but was reinstated in 2001 after his lifetime ban was turned into a four-year ban.

References
1984 bobsleigh four-man results
1988 bobsleigh two-man results
1988 bobsleigh four-man results
1992 bobsleigh two-man results
1992 bobsleigh four-man results
1994 bobsleigh two-man results
1994 bobsleigh four-man results
 BBC.co.uk 2002 article on Tout's doping suspension.
 British Olympic Association profile
 List of combined men's bobsleigh World Cup champions: 1985-2007
 List of four-man bobsleigh World Cup champions since 1985

1961 births
Living people
Bobsledders at the 1984 Winter Olympics
Bobsledders at the 1988 Winter Olympics
Bobsledders at the 1992 Winter Olympics
Bobsledders at the 1994 Winter Olympics
English male bobsledders
English sportspeople in doping cases
Olympic bobsledders of Great Britain
Sportspeople from Hitchin
Royal Tank Regiment soldiers
Doping cases in bobsleigh
Military personnel from Hertfordshire
20th-century British Army personnel